Philip D. Cloutier (October 1, 1949 – September 4, 1998) was an American politician, engineer, and attorney who served as a member of the Delaware House of Representatives and New Castle County Council.

Early life and education 
Cloutier was born in Ware, Massachusetts. He received his bachelor's and master's degrees in mechanical engineering from University of Pennsylvania in 1972 and 1974. He received his Juris Doctor from the Widener University Delaware Law School in 1982.

Career 
After graduating from law school, Cloutier was admitted to the Delaware State Bar Association. He also served as a purchasing agent for the Du Pont Company. He served on the New Castle County Council from 1988 to 1994 and later served as the council's president. Cloutier was a Republican. He served in the Delaware House of Representatives from 1994 until his death.

Upon his death, Cloutier's wife, Catherine Cloutier, was selected to succeed him in the House. She was later elected to the Delaware Senate.

Personal life 
Cloutier lived in Wilmington, Delaware with his wife and family. He died of cancer in 1998.

Notes

1949 births
1998 deaths
People from Ware, Massachusetts
People from Wilmington, Delaware
University of Pennsylvania alumni
Widener University School of Law alumni
Delaware lawyers
Republican Party members of the Delaware House of Representatives
County council members and commissioners in Delaware
20th-century American politicians
20th-century American lawyers